"Hold Me Tight" is a 1983 song from Australian rock band Cold Chisel, and appeared on the album Twentieth Century. Released as double A-side single with No Sense it reached number 14 in the Australian charts. Although the song charted, it failed to receive much radio airplay and didn't appear on any later greatest hits compilations.

Lyrically similar to the Cole Porter song Let's Do It, Let's Fall in Love, it comically lists groups that engage in sexual congress (Presidents and chauffeurs do it / Terrorists on sofas do it / Movie stars repeat it till it's right). Musically, it is in the style of 1950s rock songs.

The single was released months before the release of the album Twentieth Century. The version that appeared on the album was slightly different from the single version, which had more reverb.

The video was directed by Chilean artist Eduardo Guelfenbein, who had also done the artwork for the album and the picture sleeves.

Charts

References

Cold Chisel songs
1983 songs
Songs written by Don Walker (musician)
Warner Music Group singles